This is a list of historical capitals of China.

Four Great Ancient Capitals
There are traditionally four major historical capitals of China referred to as the "Four Great Ancient Capitals of China". The four are Beijing, Nanjing, Luoyang and Xi'an (Chang'an).

List of historical capitals of China

Sorted in alphabetical order
 Acheng District of the city of Harbin was the capital of the Jin dynasty from 1115 to 1153. It was called Shangjing or Huining Prefecture at the time. It was destroyed in 1157 and reestablished as a secondary capital in 1173.
 Anyang was the capital of the Shang dynasty (1600 BC – 1046 BC) at its peak. It was called Yin by the Zhou.
 Balasagun in modern Kyrgyzstan was the capital of the Western Liao dynasty from 1134 to 1218.
 Beijing (also romanized Peking), literally meaning "Northern Capital", previously also known as Beiping, was the capital of various dynasties and regional regimes, including:
 The state of Yan (11th century BC – 222 BC) in the Zhou dynasty, when it was called Ji.
 The short-lived regional kingdom of Yan (911–914) established by Liu Shouguang during Five Dynasties period.
 The Liao dynasty (907–1125), when it was a secondary capital called Yanjing. (Liao Lang is used as another name for Dadu during Yuan dynasty.  The city is called Nanjing (南京, not to be confused with city in Jiangsu) in Liao dynasty due to the southerly location.)
 The Jurchen-led Jin dynasty, from the 1160s to 1215, when it was called Zhongdu ("Central Capital").
 The Yuan dynasty (1271–1368), when it was called Dadu in Chinese, Daidu (direct translation from Chinese) in Mongolian, and Khanbaliq ("city of the Khan") in Altaic, Mongolian and Turkic languages. Marco Polo called it Cambuluc.
 The Ming dynasty, from 1403 to 1644, when it was called Shuntian Prefecture and then later simply as Jingshi.
 The Qing dynasty, from 1644 to 1912.
 The Beiyang government of the Republic of China, from 1912 to 1927.
 The People's Republic of China since 1949.
 Changchun was the capital of Japanese puppet state Manchukuo during the Japanese occupation in WWII, then named Hsinking (Japanese: Shinkyō, Mandarin: Xīnjīng, literally "New Capital").
 Chengde was the summer residence and capital of the Qing dynasty from 1703 to 1820.
 Chengdu was the capital city of various regional kingdoms in ancient China:
State of Shu in Warring States period
 Shu Han (AD 221–263) during the Three Kingdoms period
Kingdom of Cheng-Han during Eastern Jin period
Qiao Shu, a short-lived kingdom during Eastern Jin period
The kingdom of Li Shu, a short-lived regime established by Wang Xiaobo and Li Shun during Song dynasty
Former Shu, one of Ten Kingdoms between Tang and Song dynasties
Later Shu, one of Ten Kingdoms between Tang and Song dynasties
Da Xi established by Zhang Xianzhong during the transition between Ming and Qing dynasties
It was also briefly the seat of the Nationalist government of the Republic of China in late 1949 towards the end of the Chinese Civil War.
 Chongqing was the capital city of Ba State during Warring States period. Ming Yuzhen, the rebellion leader during the transition time between Yuan and Ming dynasties, established the Xia kingdom and set the capital city in Chongqing. Chongqing was also the provisional capital of the Nationalist government of the Republic of China during the Second Sino-Japanese War (1937–1945), and briefly the seat of the Nationalist government in late 1949 towards the end of the Chinese Civil War.
 Datong was the capital of the Northern Wei dynasty from 398 to 493.
 Emin was briefly the capital of the Western Liao dynasty from 1132 to 1134.
 Fenghao, located near present-day Xi'an, was the capital of the Western Zhou dynasty from 1046 BC to 771 BC.
 Fuzhou was briefly the capital of the Southern Ming dynasty from 1645 to 1646.
 Guangzhou (also romanized Canton) was the capital of:
Nanyue Kingdom (204–111 BC). More specifically, the Nanyue capital was in Guangzhou's Panyu District.
Southern Ming dynasty from 1646 to 1647.
Nationalist government of the Republic of China, before 1928 and in 1949 towards the end of the Chinese Civil War.
 Hangzhou was the capital of:
Wuyue Kingdom (907–978) during the Five Dynasties and Ten Kingdoms period.
Southern Song dynasty, from 1127 to 1276, when it was called Lin'an.
 Haojing was capital of Western Zhou.
 Kaifeng was the capital of various dynasties, including:
 The state of Wei (443 BC – 225 BC) in the Zhou dynasty, when it was called Daliang.
Later Liang dynasty during the Five Dynasties and Ten Kingdoms period, from AD 913 to 923.
Later Jin dynasty during the Five Dynasties and Ten Kingdoms period, in AD 937.
Later Han dynasty (AD 947–951) during the Five Dynasties and Ten Kingdoms period.
Later Zhou dynasty (AD 951–960) during the Five Dynasties and Ten Kingdoms period.
Northern Song dynasty (960–1127), when it was called Bianjing.
 Karakorum in modern Mongolia was the capital of the Northern Yuan dynasty from 1371 to 1388.
 Luoyang was the capital of various dynasties, including:
 The Eastern Zhou dynasty, from 510 BC to 314 BC.
 The Eastern Han dynasty from AD 25 to 190 and then briefly in AD 196.
 The Cao Wei (AD 220–265) during the Three Kingdoms period.
 The Western Jin dynasty, from AD 265 to 311.
 The Northern Wei dynasty from AD 493 to 534.
 The Wu Zhou from AD 690 to 705.
 The Later Tang dynasty during the Five Dynasties and Ten Kingdoms period, from AD 923 to 936.
 The Later Liang dynasty during the Five Dynasties and Ten Kingdoms period, from AD 907 to 913.
 Nanjing (also romanized Nanking), literally meaning "Southern Capital", was the capital of various dynasties and governments, including:
 All the Six Dynasties from AD 220 to 589, when Nanjing was called Jianye or Jiankang. The Six Dynasties were:
 Eastern Wu during the Three Kingdoms period, from AD 229 to 265, and then from AD 266 to 280.
 Eastern Jin dynasty, from AD 317 to 420.
 Liu Song dynasty (AD 420–479)
 Southern Qi dynasty (AD 479–502)
 Liang dynasty, from AD 502 to 552, and then from AD 555 to 557.
 Chen dynasty (AD 557–589)
 The Southern Tang dynasty (AD 937–976) during the Five Dynasties and Ten Kingdoms period
 The Ming dynasty, from 1368 to 1644, when it was also called Yingtian Prefecture
 The Southern Ming dynasty from 1644 to 1645.
 The Taiping Heavenly Kingdom (1851–1864) during the Taiping Rebellion in the Qing dynasty, when it was called Tianjing.
 The Nationalist government of the Republic of China from 1928 to 1949.
 The Reorganized National Government of the Republic of China (1940–1945), a pro-Japanese collaborationist government headed by Wang Jingwei during the Second Sino-Japanese War.
 Ruijin in Jiangxi was the capital of the self-declared Chinese Soviet Republic from 1931 to 1934, the start of the Long March.
 Shenyang in the northern state of Liaoning briefly served as the capital of the Qing dynasty (who referred to it as Mukden) from 1625 until Qing takeover of Beijing in 1644.
 Taipei in Taiwan has been the de facto capital and the seat of government of the Republic of China since 1949.
 Tongwancheng was the capital of the Hu Xia dynasty from 419 to 427.
 Wuhan was the capital of a government formed by Wang Jingwei and leftist members of the Kuomintang in 1927. It opposed the Nationalist government led by Kuomintang leader Chiang Kai-shek.
 Xanadu / Shangdu, located northwest of present-day Dolon Nor in Inner Mongolia, China, was the summer capital of the Yuan dynasty. After the fall of the Yuan dynasty, it briefly became the capital of the Northern Yuan dynasty between 1368 and 1369. It was destroyed in 1369.
 Xi'an (also romanized Sian), previously called Chang'an, and including its surrounding areas in present-day Shaanxi Province, was the capital of various dynasties, including:
 The Western Zhou dynasty, from around 1046 BC to 771 BC. See also Fenghao.
 The state of Qin (9th century  BC – 221 BC) and the Qin dynasty (221–206 BC). The Qin capital, called Xianyang, was located near present-day Xi'an. It was destroyed in 206 BC.
 The Western Han dynasty, from 206 BC to AD 9.
 The Xin dynasty (AD 9–23)
 The Eastern Han dynasty, from AD 190 to 195.
 The Western Jin dynasty, from AD 312 to 316.
 The state of Former Zhao during the Sixteen Kingdoms period, from AD 318 to 329.
 The State of Former Qin during the Sixteen Kingdoms period, from AD 351 to 385.
 The State of Later Qin during the Sixteen Kingdoms period, from AD 384 to 417.
 The Western Wei dynasty (AD 535–557)
 The Northern Zhou dynasty (AD 557–581)
 The Sui dynasty, from AD 581 to 605.
 The Tang dynasty, from AD 618 to 684, and then from AD 705 to 904.
 Ye, located within the present-day city of Handan, was one of secondary capital cities of Cao Wei (220-265), and the capital city of several regional kingdoms during Eastern Jin period: Later Zhao (319-351), Ran Wei (350-352) and Former Yan (337-370). It was also the capital city of two major dynasties in Southern and Northern dynasties period: Eastern Wei dynasty (534-550), and the Northern Qi dynasty (550–577).
 Yinchuan was the capital of the Western Xia from 1038 to 1227, when it was called Xingqing.
 Yingchang was briefly the capital of the Northern Yuan dynasty from 1369 to 1370.
 Zhaoge was the secondary capital city during last years of Shang dynasty when it was ruled by King Zhou. Later, it was the capital city of Wey during the Eastern Zhou period.
 Zhaoqing was the capital of the Southern Ming dynasty from 1646 to 1662.

Chronology

See also 

 List of the current and former capitals of the subdivisions of China
 Chinese palace
 Dynasties in Chinese history

References

 
China